Cwmdu may refer to:
Cwmdu, Swansea
Cwmdu, Carmarthenshire
Cwmdu, Powys